Fyodorovka is a rural locality (a village) in Kurilovskoye Rural Settlement, Sobinsky District, Vladimir Oblast, Russia. The population was 13 as of 2010.

Geography 
Fyodorovka is located 14 km northwest of Sobinka (the district's administrative centre) by road. Uvarovo is the nearest rural locality.

References 

Rural localities in Sobinsky District